The following is a list of the monastic houses in Kent, England.

See also
 List of monastic houses in England

Notes

References

Medieval sites in England
Kent
Lists of buildings and structures in Kent
Kent